The 1926 general strike in the United Kingdom was a general strike that lasted nine days, from 4 to 12 May 1926. It was called by the General Council of the Trades Union Congress (TUC) in an unsuccessful attempt to force the British government to act to prevent wage reductions and worsening conditions for 1.2 million locked-out coal miners. Some 1.7 million workers went out, especially in transport and heavy industry. The government was well prepared, and enlisted middle class volunteers to maintain essential services. There was little violence and the TUC gave up in defeat.

Causes
From 1914 to 1918, the United Kingdom participated in World War I. Heavy domestic use of coal during the war depleted once-rich seams. Britain exported less coal during the war than it would have in peacetime, allowing other countries to fill the gap. This particularly benefited the strong coal industries of the United States, Poland, and Germany. In the early 1880s, coal production was at a peak of 310 tons per man annually, but in the four years preceding the war, this amount had fallen to 247 tons. By the 1920–1924 period, this had fallen further to just 199 tons. Total coal output had been in decline since 1914 as well.

In 1924, the Dawes Plan was implemented. It allowed Germany to re-enter the international coal market by exporting "free coal" to France and Italy, as part of their reparations for the war. This extra supply reduced coal prices. In 1925, Winston Churchill, the chancellor of the Exchequer, reintroduced the gold standard. This made the British pound too strong for effective exporting to take place from Britain. Furthermore, because of the economic processes involved in maintaining a strong currency, interest rates were raised, which hurt some businesses.

Mine owners wanted to maintain profits even during times of economic instability, which often took the form of wage reductions for miners in their employment. Miners' weekly pay had been lowered from £6 to £3 18s. over seven years. Coupled with the prospect of longer working hours for miners, the industry was thrown into disarray.
When mine owners announced that their intention was to reduce miners' wages, the Miners' Federation of Great Britain rejected the terms: "Not a penny off the pay, not a minute on the day." The Trades Union Congress responded to the news by promising to support the miners in their dispute. The Conservative government, under Prime Minister Stanley Baldwin, decided to intervene by declaring that a nine-month subsidy would be provided to maintain the miners' wages and that a Royal Commission, under the chairmanship of Sir Herbert Samuel, would look into the problems of the mining industry and consider its impact on other industries, families, and organisations dependent on coal supply.

The Samuel Commission published a report on 10 March 1926 recommending that national agreements, the nationalisation of royalties, and sweeping reorganisation and improvement should be considered for the mining industry. It also recommended a reduction by 13.5% of miners' wages, along with the withdrawal of the government subsidy. Two weeks later, the prime minister announced that the government would accept the report if other parties also did.

A previous royal commission, the Sankey Commission in 1919, had failed to reach an agreement, producing four different reports with proposals ranging from complete restoration of private ownership and control, to complete nationalisation. David Lloyd George, the then prime minister, offered reorganisation, which was rejected by the miners.

After the Samuel Commission's report, the mine owners declared that miners would be offered new terms of employment, which included lengthening the work day and reducing wages depending on various factors. The Miners' Federation of Great Britain refused the wage reduction and regional negotiation.

General strike, May 1926

The final negotiations began on 1 May but failed to achieve an agreement, leading to an announcement by the TUC that a general strike "in defence of miners' wages and hours" was to begin on 3 May, a Monday, at one minute to midnight.

The leaders of the Labour Party were not happy about the proposed general strike because they were aware of the revolutionary elements within the union movement and of the damage that the association would do to the party's new reputation as a party of government. During the next two days, frantic efforts were made to reach an agreement between the government and the mining industry representatives. However, they failed, mainly because of an eleventh-hour decision by printers of the Daily Mail to refuse to print an editorial ("For King and Country") condemning the general strike. They objected to the following passage: "A general strike is not an industrial dispute. It is a revolutionary move which can only succeed by destroying the government and subverting the rights and liberties of the people".

Baldwin was now concerned about the TUC and printers' action interfering with the freedom of the press.

King George V tried to stabilise the situation and create balance saying, "Try living on their wages before you judge them."

The TUC feared that an all-out general strike would bring revolutionary elements to the fore and limited the participants to railwaymen, transport workers, printers, dockers, ironworkers, and steelworkers, as they were regarded as pivotal in the dispute.

The government had been preparing for the strike over the nine months in which it had provided a subsidy by creating organisations such as the Organisation for the Maintenance of Supplies, and it did whatever it could to keep the country moving. It rallied support by emphasizing the revolutionary nature of the strikers. The armed forces and volunteer workers helped maintain basic services. It used the Emergency Powers Act 1920 to maintain essential supplies.

On 4 May 1926, the number of strikers was about 1.5–1.75 million. There were strikers "from John o' Groats to Land's End". The reaction to the strike call was immediate and overwhelming, surprising both the government and the TUC; the latter not being in control of the strike. On this first day, there were no major initiatives and no dramatic events except for the nation's transport being at a standstill.

On 5 May 1926, both sides gave their views. Churchill commented as editor of the government newspaper British Gazette: "I do not agree that the TUC have as much right as the Government to publish their side of the case and to exhort their followers to continue action. It is a very much more difficult task to feed the nation than it is to wreck it". Baldwin wrote, "The general strike is a challenge to the parliament and is the road to anarchy". The British Worker, the TUC's newspaper, wrote: "We are not making war on the people. We are anxious that the ordinary members of the public shall not be penalized for the unpatriotic conduct of the mine owners and the government".

In the meantime, the government put in place a "militia" of special constables called the Organisation for the Maintenance of Supplies (OMS) of volunteers to maintain order in the street. A special constable said: "It was not difficult to understand the strikers' attitude toward us. After a few days I found my sympathy with them rather than with the employers. For one thing, I had never realized the appalling poverty which existed. If I had been aware of all the facts, I should not have joined up as a special constable". It was decided that fascists would not be allowed to enlist in the OMS without first giving up their political beliefs, as the government feared a right-wing backlash so the fascists formed the so-called "Q Division" under Rotha Lintorn-Orman to combat the strikers.

On 6 May 1926, there was a change of atmosphere. The government newspaper, British Gazette, suggested that means of transport into London began to improve compared to the first day with volunteers, car sharing, cyclists, private buses, as well as strikebreakers. A statement on the front page indicated 200 LGOC buses 'on the streets'. Only 86 LGOC buses, however were operating.

On 7 May 1926, the TUC met with Samuel and worked out a set of proposals designed to end the dispute. The Miners' Federation rejected the proposals. The British Worker was increasingly difficult to operate, as Churchill had requisitioned the bulk of the supply of the paper's newsprint so it reduced its size from eight pages to four. In the meantime, the government took action to protect the men who decided to return to work.

On 8 May 1926, there was a dramatic moment on the London Docks. Lorries were protected by the British Army. They broke the picket line and transported food to Hyde Park. That showed that the government was in greater control of the situation. It was also a measure of Baldwin's rationalism, in place of Churchill's more reactionary stance. Churchill had wanted, in a move that could have proved unnecessarily antagonistic to the strikers, to arm the soldiers. Baldwin, however, had insisted otherwise. In Plymouth, tram services were restarted, with some vehicles attacked and windows smashed. However, not all strike actions in the city were confrontational; a football match, attended by thousands, occurs between a team of policemen and strikers, with the strikers winning 2–0. The supporters included a delegation of 4,000 strikers, which marched to the grounds accompanied by a marching band.

On 11 May 1926, the Flying Scotsman was derailed by striking miners at Cramlington, a short distance North of Newcastle upon Tyne. The British Worker, alarmed at the fears of the General Council of the TUC that there was to be a mass drift back to work, claimed: "The number of strikers has not diminished; it is increasing. There are more workers out today than there have been at any moment since the strike began".

However, the National Sailors' and Firemen's Union applied for an injunction in the Chancery Division of the High Court to enjoin the General-Secretary of its Tower Hill branch from calling its members out on strike. Mr Justice Astbury granted the injunction by ruling that no trade dispute could exist between the TUC and "the government of the nation" and that except for the strike in the coal industry, the general strike was not protected by Trade Disputes Act 1906. In addition, he ruled that the strike in the plaintiff union had been called in contravention of its own rules. As a result, the unions involved became liable, by common law, for incitement to breach of contract and faced potential sequestration of their assets by employers.

On 12 May 1926, the TUC General Council visited 10 Downing Street to announce its decision to call off the strike if the proposals worked out by the Samuel Commission were respected and the government offered a guarantee there would be no victimization of strikers. The government stated that it had "no power to compel employers to take back every man who had been on strike". However, the TUC agreed to end the dispute without such an agreement. Various strikes continued after this as their unions negotiated deals with companies for their members to return to work.

Aftermath
The miners maintained resistance for a few months before being forced, by their own economic needs, to return to the mines. By the end of November, most miners were back at work. However, many remained unemployed for many years. Those still employed were forced to accept longer hours, lower wages, and district wage agreements.

The effect on British coal mines was profound. By the late 1930s, employment in mining had fallen by more than a third from its pre-strike peak of 1.2 million miners, but productivity had rebounded from under 200 tons produced per miner, to over 300 tons by the outbreak of the Second World War.

The split in the miners that resulted from Spencerism and the agreement of the Nottinghamshire miners to return to work, against the policy of the Miners' Federation of Great Britain divided the coal miners as a national bargaining force until the establishment of the National Union of Mineworkers.

The Trade Disputes and Trade Unions Act 1927 banned sympathy strikes, general strikes, and mass picketing, creating a system whereby trade union members had to 'opt-in' to paying the political levy to the Labour Party.

In the long run, there was little impact on trade union activity or industrial relations. The TUC and trade union movement remained intact and did not change their basic policies. Keith Laybourn says that historians mostly agree that "In no significant way could the General Strike be considered a turning point or watershed in British industrial history." There have been no further general strikes in Britain, as union leaders such as Ernest Bevin, who had coordinated the strike, considered it a mistake; they decided that action by political parties was a better solution. However, the country came close to a one-day general strike on 31 July 1972 over the imprisonment of the Pentonville Five.

The Winter of Discontent was the period between November 1978 and February 1979 in the United Kingdom characterised by widespread strikes by private, and later public, sector trade unions demanding pay rises greater than the limits the Labour government had been imposing, against Trades Union Congress (TUC) opposition, to control inflation.

In popular culture
Young Anarchy by Philip Gibbs was the first novel to mention the general strike.
Meanwhile (1927) by H. G. Wells was the first novel to feature the general strike and describes its effect on the British labour movement.
Swan Song, a 1928 novel by John Galsworthy that is part of The Forsyte Saga, depicts the response of the English upper classes to the strike.
 The poet Hugh MacDiarmid composed an ultimately pessimistic lyrical response to the strike, which he incorporated into his long modernist poem of the same year, "A Drunk Man Looks at the Thistle". His imagistic depiction of how events unfolded occurs in the extended passage beginning "I saw a rose come loupin oot..." (line 1119).
 Harold Heslop's 1929 novel The Gate of a Strange Field is set during the strike and describes the events from the viewpoint of striking miners.
 Ellen Wilkinson's 1929 novel Clash focuses on a woman activist's involvement with the strike.
 The strike functions as the "endpiece" of the satirical novel, The Apes of God, by Wyndham Lewis. In that novel, the half-hearted nature of the strike, and its eventual collapse, represents the political and moral stagnation of 1920s Britain.
 The strike forms the climax of Cloud Howe (1933), by Lewis Grassic Gibbon, part of his A Scots Quair series of novels.
 In James Hilton's 1934 novel Goodbye, Mr. Chips, the retired schoolmaster Chipping calls the strike "a very fine advertisement" since there was "not a life lost" and "not a shot fired".
 The failure of the strike inspired Idris Davies to write "Bells of Rhymney" (published 1938), which Pete Seeger made into the song "The Bells of Rhymney" (recorded 1958).
 In the 1945 novel, Brideshead Revisited by Evelyn Waugh, the main character, Charles Ryder, returns from France to London to fight against the workers on strike.
 Not Honour More  (1955) by Joyce Cary is a historical novel revolving around the strike. 
 Raymond Williams's 1960 novel Border Country, Matthew Price's father is a part of the strike, alongside his signalmen colleagues.
 The LWT series Upstairs, Downstairs devoted an episode, "The Nine Days Wonder" (Series Five, episode 9; original airing date, 2 November 1975), to the general strike.
 The strike is referred to in several episodes of the BBC sitcom You Rang M'Lord?.
 In the 1970s and the 1980s, "Strikes 1926" was a short-lived restaurant chain in London. The interiors of the restaurants were decorated with photographs from the strike.
 Touchstone, a 2007 novel by Laurie R. King, is set in the final weeks before the strike.  The issues and factions involved, and an attempt to forestall the strike are key plot points.
 A BBC series, The House of Eliott, included an episode depicting the general strike.
 In the novel Any Human Heart by William Boyd, the protagonist Logan Mountstuart volunteers himself as a special constable in the strike.
 Robert Rae's 2012 film The Happy Lands is set amongst coal miners in Fife during the strike.
 The fourth part of Ken Loach's film tetralogy Days of Hope is devoted to the strike.
 In the alternate history short story If the General Strike Had Succeeded by Ronald Knox contained in the anthology If It Had Happened Otherwise, the story is in the form of an article from The Times of 1931, which describes Great Britain under communist rule.
 The strike is constantly mentioned in David Peace's book GB84 in which the older characters often mention the 1926 strike to draw parallels with the long miners' strike of 1984–85.
 The fourth series of the BBC2 television show Peaky Blinders is set in the period immediately prior to and during the strike. The series emphasises the involvement of revolutionary communist elements including Jessie Eden.

Footnotes

Further reading
 Barron, Hester. The 1926 Miners' Lockout: Meanings of Community in the Durham Coalfield (2010)
 Chaloner, W. H. "The British Miners and the Coal Industry between the Wars" History Today (June 1964) 14#5 pp418–426, focus on historiography of 1926 miners.
 Ferrall, Charles, and Dougal McNeill, eds. Writing the 1926 General Strike: Literature, Culture, Politics (Cambridge University Press, 2015).
 Gildart, Keith. "The Women and Men of 1926: A Gender and Social History of the General Strike and Miners' Lockout in South Wales", Journal of British Studies, (July 2011) 50#3 pp 758–759
 Gildart, Keith. "The Miners' Lockout in 1926 in the Cumberland Coalfield", Northern History, (Sept 2007) 44#2 pp 169–192
 Hattersley, Roy. Borrowed Time: The Story of Britain Between the Wars (2008) pp 115–42.
 
 Morris, Margaret. The General Strike (1976) 479pp; detailed history
 Mowat, Charles Loch. Britain between the wars: 1918-1940 (1955) pp 284–338
 Perkins, Anne. A Very British Strike: 3–12 May 1926 (2008)
 Phillips, G A. The General Strike: The Politics of Industrial Conflict (1976)
 Reid, Alastair, and Steven Tolliday, "The General Strike, 1926", Historical Journal (1977) 20#4 pp. 1001–1012 in JSTOR, on historiography
 Robertson, D. H. "A Narrative of the General Strike of 1926", Economic Journal (1926) 36#143 pp 375–393 in JSTOR by a leading economics professor
 Saltzman, Rachelle Hope. A Lark for the Sake of Their Country: The 1926 General Strike Volunteers in Folklore and Memory. Manchester University Press, 2012.
 Saltzman, Rachelle H. "Public Displays, Play, and Power: The 1926 General Strike." Southern Folklore: Façade Performances (Special Issue) (1995) 52(2):161-186. 
 Saltzman, Rachelle H. "Folklore as Politics in Great Britain: Working-Class Critiques of Upper-Class Strike Breakers in the 1926 General Strike". Anthropological Quarterly Vol. 67, no. 3, 1994, pp. 105–121., https://www.jstor.org/stable/3317548  
 Somervell, D.C. The Reign of King George V, (1936) pp 351–68.online free
 Symons, Julian. The General Strike. A Historical Portrait (1957)
 Taylor, Robert. TUC: From the General Strike to New Unionism (2000) 313pp
 Skelley, Jeffrey. The General Strike 1926. Lawrence and Wishardt, London 1976
 Smith, Harold. Remember 1926. A book list. Remember 1926, Coventgarden 1976
 Turnbull, Tommy. A Miners Life The History Press 2007
 Usherwood, Stephen. "The B.B.C. and the General Strike" History Today (Dec 1972), Vol. 22 Issue 12, pp 858–865 online.

Video
 The 1975 BBC series Days of Hope depicts events that led up to the 1926 strike.

External links

 The General Strike Overview and reproductions of original documents at The Union Makes Us Strong, History of Trades Union Congress
 Reporting the General Strike: Contemporary accounts of "The Nine Day Wonder", digitised documents from the Modern Records Centre, University of Warwick
 The General Strike at Spartacus Educational
 The General Strike at marxists.org
 Churchill & The Gold Standard, UK Parliament Living Heritage
 Ten Days in the Class War – Merseyside and the 1926 General Strike in Autumn 2006 issue of Nerve magazine, Liverpool
 General Strike 1926 at Sheffield City Council.
  A socialist analysis of the strike by the Socialist Party of England and Wales General Secretary, Peter Taaffe.

General strikes in the United Kingdom
United Kingdom General Strike, 1926
General strike
Social history of the United Kingdom

Miners' labour disputes in the United Kingdom

British trade unions history
History of mining in the United Kingdom
May 1926 events